Robert Major ("R. M.") Garrett (1807-1885),  was a doctor and Virginia politician who served as mayor of Williamsburg, Virginia, from 1859 to 1863.  Garrett was educated at the College of William & Mary, and, in addition to serving as mayor, he was a physician and the administrator of Eastern State Hospital.

References

Mayors of Williamsburg, Virginia
1807 births
1885 deaths
College of William & Mary alumni
19th-century American politicians